Daniel Black Chisholm (November 30, 1832 – September 22, 1898) was a farmer, lawyer and mayor of Hamilton, Ontario from 1871–1872. In the 1872 federal election he was elected to the House of Commons of Canada representing Hamilton as a Liberal-Conservative. He was re-elected in Halton in 1874 but unseated in 1875 after an appeal and defeated in the 1875 by-election which followed.

Biography
He was born in East Flamboro Township, Wentworth County, Canada West, the son of George Chisholm. After the death of his parents, Chisholm farmed for a number of years. In 1837, he sold the farm and studied for two years at Victoria College in Cobourg. Chisholm studied law with Miles O'Reilly in Hamilton, was called to the bar in 1864 and set up practice in Hamilton. In 1864, he married Adeline Davis; Chisholm and his wife were both involved in the temperance movement in Hamilton. He was president of the Standard Fire Insurance Company, the Alliance Insurance Company and the Canada Loan and Banking Company. Chisholm was also Chairman of the Board of Directors for the Hamilton and North-Western Railway and served as a major in the Canadian Militia.

In 1883 Chisholm left town suddenly, having suffered a large business loss around $100,000 and used clients money to repay. He and his 15-year-old son fled to Evanston, Illinois, just outside Chicago. His wife was ill at the time, but she later came to Chicago and petitioned for a divorce, eventually securing a decree absolute. Although the legality of this divorce under Canadian law was questioned, she remarried in July 1889, to the Hon. George Eulas Foster, Minister of Finance for Canada.

Chisholm was reported to have been planning to move to Australia and his death was later reported in 1899.

His actual death date was 22 Sep 1898 as recorded on his gravemarker in Woodlawn Cemetery, Macclenny, Florida.

Electoral record

	

					

|-

|Conservative Labour
|Henry Buckingham Witton  
|align="right"| 1,422  
|align="right"|x  

|}

References

External links
 
 

Mayors of Hamilton, Ontario
Conservative Party of Canada (1867–1942) MPs
Members of the House of Commons of Canada from Ontario
1832 births
1899 deaths